Ladislav Prokeš (7 June 1884 – 9 January 1966) was a Czech chess master and one of the most prolific composers of endgame studies in chess. He was born and died in Prague.

Prokeš was joint Czech Champion in 1921 and played for the Czech Olympiad team in 1927, 1928, and 1930. In 1951 he published a collection of studies "Kniha šachových studií". His 1,159 endgame studies, as listed in Harold van der Heijden's database, rank fourth among all composers.

Prokeš maneuver

The Prokeš maneuver is a tactic in chess that enables a rook to draw against two advanced pawns in a chess endgame. Prokeš composed an endgame study in 1939 which illustrated the Prokeš maneuver for the first time. The solution begins: 
1. Kg4 e2
2. Rc1+ Kd4
3. Kf3 d2
and Black threatens to promote a pawn, which would win. But White forces the draw with: 
4. Rc4+! Kd3
5. Rd4+! Kxd4
6. Kxe2 Kc3
7. Kd1 Kd3 stalemate
The idea is, that by vacating the c1-square on the fourth move, White's rook prevents Black's pawn from capturing on c1. The white king is then able to reach the d1-square, stopping the pawn. The position after 6.Kxe2 is drawn (see King and pawn versus king endgame).

References
Notes

Bibliography

External links
 Ladislav Prokes at Chessgames.com
 Ladislav Prokes: The Player's Composer by A. J. Roycroft. EG 7, January 1967, p. 1.
 Obituary for Ladislav Prokes by A. J. Roycroft. EG 5, July 1966, pp. 104–05.

Chess composers
Chess Olympiad competitors
1884 births
1966 deaths
Czech chess players
Sportspeople from Prague